Vukašin Mandić (born June 7, 1982, in Vršac) is a Serbian professional basketball player who currently plays for Near East University B.C. of the Cyprus Basketball Division 1.

Honors
Club honors
Serbian Cup - champion (2005) with FMP

References

External links
  at kumanovonews.com
  at realgm.com
  at kkfmp.rs
  at b92.net

1982 births
Living people
APOEL B.C. players
AEK B.C. players
KK Borac Čačak players
KK FMP (1991–2011) players
KK Crvena zvezda players
KK Radnički KG 06 players
People from Vršac
Serbian expatriate basketball people in Cyprus
Serbian expatriate basketball people in Greece
Serbian expatriate basketball people in Israel
Serbian expatriate basketball people in Romania
Serbian expatriate basketball people in Slovenia
Serbian expatriate basketball people in Sweden
Serbian expatriate basketball people in North Macedonia
Serbian men's basketball players
Forwards (basketball)